Ebenezer Tracy Wells (May 15, 1835 – April 20, 1923) was a jurist from Colorado. He served as an associate justice in both the territorial and state supreme courts.

Early life
Wells was born in Oswego County, New York on May 15, 1835. He graduated from Knox College in Galesburg, Illinois in 1855. He was admitted to the bar in 1856 and practiced law in Rock Island, Illinois until he joined the United States Army as a first lieutenant and served during the Civil War.

Career in Colorado
Wells moved to Colorado in October 1865 and settled first in Gilpin County. In the territorial government, he served as a member of the lower house of the 5th general assembly. In 1871, President Ulysses S. Grant appointed Wells associate justice of the territorial supreme court to fill out the term of Christian S. Eyster, who had resigned, and he served for four years until 1875. He was a member of the Colorado Constitutional Convention.

When Colorado gained statehood in 1876, Wells was one of four successful candidates elected to the Colorado Supreme Court. However, he resigned at the end of the court's first term after serving only one year on the bench.

Later life
Long after serving as a State Supreme Court Justice, Wells served for eleven years (1909-1920) as the Reporter of the Supreme Court.

He also ran for mayor of Denver in 1901 but lost the election.

Death
Wells died on April 20, 1923, aged 87, in Denver. He is buried in Denver's Fairmount Cemetery.

References

Justices of the Colorado Supreme Court
1835 births
1923 deaths
Knox College (Illinois) alumni
Colorado lawyers
Court reporters
People from Denver
19th-century American lawyers